Dangerous Trails is a 1923 American silent Western film directed by Alan James and starring Irene Rich, Tully Marshall, and Noah Beery. It is a northern, featuring a member of the North-West Mounted Police on the track of a smuggling gang.

Plot
As described in a film magazine review, Steve Bradley, a dance hall proprietor in the Canadian Northwest, is in league with opium smugglers Jean Le Fere and Wang. Steve is engaged to Grace Alderson, a singer in his resort. Roland St. Clair, a North-West Mounted Police detective, goes on the smugglers' trail. Grace vamps him and they fall in love. In the finale, after many wild adventures, the smugglers are captured across the border in the United States when federal officers raid Wang's Chinatown den. Grace turns out to be in the employ of the police and marries St. Clair.

Cast
 Irene Rich as Grace Alderson
 Tully Marshall as Steve Bradley
 Noah Beery as Inspector Criswell
 Allan Penrose as Roland St. Clair
 William Lowery as Jean Le Fere
 Jack Curtis as Wang
 Jane Talent as Beatrice Layton

References

Bibliography
 Connelly, Robert B. The Silents: Silent Feature Films, 1910-36, Volume 40, Issue 2. December Press, 1998.
 Munden, Kenneth White. The American Film Institute Catalog of Motion Pictures Produced in the United States, Part 1. University of California Press, 1997.

External links
 

1923 films
1923 Western (genre) films
1920s English-language films
American silent feature films
Silent American Western (genre) films
Films directed by Alan James
American black-and-white films
1920s American films